Metanoia (from the Greek , metanoia, "changing one's mind") has been used in psychology since at least the time of American philosopher/psychologist William James to describe a process of fundamental change in the human personality.

The term derives from the Ancient Greek words μετά (metá) (meaning "beyond" or "after") and  νόος (noeō) (meaning "perception" or "understanding" or "mind"), and takes on different meanings in different contexts.

Developments
William James used the term metanoia to refer to a fundamental and stable change in an individual's life-orientation. Carl Gustav Jung developed the usage to indicate a spontaneous attempt of the psyche to heal itself of unbearable conflict by melting down and then being reborn in a more adaptive form – a form of self healing often associated with the mid-life crisis and psychotic breakdown, which can be viewed as a potentially productive process. Jung considered that psychotic episodes in particular could be understood as an existential crisis which might be an attempt at self-reparation: in such instances metanoia could represent a shift in the balance of the personality away from the persona towards the shadow and the self.

Jung's concept of metanoia was an influence on R.D. Laing and his emphasis on the dissolution and replacement of everyday ego consciousness. Laing's colleague, David Cooper, considered that "metanoia means change from the depths of oneself upwards into the superficies of one's social appearance" – a process that in the second of its three stages "generates the 'signs' of depression and mourning". Similarly influenced was the therapeutic community movement. Ideally, it aimed to support people whilst they broke down and went through spontaneous healing, rather than thwarting such efforts at self-repair by strengthening a person's existing character defences and thereby maintaining the underlying conflict.

The Dutch psychiatrist Jan Foudraine wrote extensively about it, tracing its history through the work of Jung and Laing, and eventually considering it “a permanent change in gestalt.” He cites an example where one sees a black vase, then one blinks, and instead one sees two white faces in profile opposite each other (the Rubin vase).

In transactional analysis, metanoia is used to describe the experience of abandoning an old scripted self or false self for a more open one: a process which may be marked by a mixture of intensity, despair, self-surrender, and an encounter with the inner void.

See also

References

Further reading

 James, William, (1890), The Principles of Psychology, (New York)
 Jung, Carl, (1960), The Structure and Dynamics of the Psyche, CW 8. Princeton: Princeton University Press.
 Jung, Carl, (1959), The Archetypes and the Collective Unconscious, CW 9i. Princeton: Princeton University Press.
 Jung, Carl, (1959), Aion: Researches into the Phenomenology of the Self, Collected Works, 9ii. Princeton: Princeton University Press.
 Jung, Carl, (1970), Civilization in Transition, CW 10. Princeton: Princeton University Press.
 Jung, Carl, (1969), Psychology and Religion: West and East, CW 11. Princeton: Princeton University Press.
 Jung, Carl, (1954), The Practice of Psychotherapy, CW 16. Princeton: Princeton University Press.
 Jung, Carl, (1976), The Symbolic Life, CW 18. Princeton: Princeton University Press.
 Keirsey, David & Marilyn Bates (1984), Please Understand Me, Del Mar CA: Prometheus Nemesis Books.
 Schumacher, E.F. (1973), Small Is Beautiful: A Study of Economics As If People Mattered, New York: Harper & Row.
 Tart, Charles (1987), Waking Up: Overcoming the Obstacles to Human Potential, Boston: Shambhala.
 R. D. Laing, The Politics of Experience (Penguin 1984)

External links

 

Analytical psychology
Personal life
Philosophy of life
Midlife crisis